Gongogi is a municipality in the state of Bahia in the North-East region of Brazil. It was named after the Gongogi River which forms the southern border of the municipality.

See also
List of municipalities in Bahia

References

Municipalities in Bahia